The Birmingham Youth Cup (Saturday & Sunday Combined) is a defunct cup competition which was run by the Birmingham County F.A for football teams that competed in an affiliated or sanctioned league  throughout the Birmingham F.A.
The competition was an inter league competition which seen Saturday and Sunday football teams compete amongst each other.

Youth Cup Finalists 
The Youth Cup (sat & sun) is a defunct County Cup which started in the 1964/65 season. The 1992/93 season was the final season for this particular competition (reason not known)

Results

Results by team

Notes
A.  Northfield Juniors and Northfield Town are the same team just with a different suffix added. (See Junior Honours on citation)

References

External links
Birmingham FA's Official Website

County football associations
Football in the West Midlands (county)
Football in Warwickshire